Jorge Querejeta Capella (born September 1, 1968) is a former field hockey player from Argentina. He competed for his native country at the 1996 Summer Olympics, where he finished in ninth place with the national squad. He won the gold medal at the 1995 Pan American Games.

References

External links
 

1968 births
Living people
Argentine male field hockey players
Field hockey players at the 1996 Summer Olympics
Olympic field hockey players of Argentina
Pan American Games gold medalists for Argentina
Pan American Games medalists in field hockey
Field hockey players at the 1995 Pan American Games
Medalists at the 1995 Pan American Games
20th-century Argentine people